Wonderland station is a transit station in Revere, Massachusetts. Located adjacent to Revere Beach, it is the current northern terminus of the MBTA Blue Line rapid transit system, as well as a major bus transfer station for the North Shore area. The station is fully accessible.

A previous station, Bath House, was open near the site on the Boston, Revere Beach and Lynn Railroad from approximately 1900 to 1940. Wonderland station opened in January 1954. It was rebuilt in 1995, repaired in 2008, and upgraded with a large parking garage and pedestrian bridge in 2012.

The station plays a role in the 1998 film Next Stop Wonderland as the eponymous destination of the main characters.

History

BRB&L

The narrow-gauge Boston, Revere Beach and Lynn Railroad (BRB&L) opened from East Boston to Lynn on July 29, 1875. The line ran directly adjacent to the beachfront, a popular summer destination, on the alignment of the modern Revere Beach Boulevard. The Eastern Railroad opened its Chelsea Beach Branch in 1881 along the modern Blue Line corridor slightly inland. A third line - the Boston, Winthrop, and Shore Railroad - shared the Chelsea Beach Branch alignment in 1884-5. None of the three railroads initially stopped at the modern station site, which was then an unpopulated swampy area.

The Chelsea Beach Branch, which operated only during the summer, ended operations in 1891, although the rails remained in place until the 1920s. In April 1897, the BRB&L was moved inland onto the modern right-of-way next to the abandoned Chelsea Beach Branch. A new station, Bath House, was soon built on the east side of the tracks across from the new Revere Beach Bath House, just north of the modern station site. By 1928 the line was electrified, with pre-pay stations - more a rapid transit line than a conventional railroad. However, due to the Great Depression, the BRB&L shut down on January 27, 1940.

M.T.A. and MBTA

In 1941, the Boston Elevated Railway bought the BRB&L right of way from Day Square to Revere Beach for use as a high-speed trolley line similar to the Ashmont-Mattapan High Speed Line; these plans were delayed by the onset of World War II. The 1926 Report on Improved Transportation Facilities and 1945–47 Coolidge Commission Report recommended that the East Boston Tunnel line, which had been converted to rapid transit from streetcars in 1924, be extended to Lynn via the BBRB&L route rather than using it for a trolley line.

In 1947, the newly formed Metropolitan Transit Authority (M.T.A.) decided to build to Lynn as a rapid transit line, and construction began in October 1948. Wonderland was originally to be named Bath House after the former station, but instead was named after the now-closed Wonderland Greyhound Park - itself named after Wonderland Amusement Park, which operated at the site from 1906 to 1911.

The Wonderland Blue Line terminus station has been in mostly continuous operation since 1954; however, service has been interrupted several times due to weather and construction. It was closed for flood damage from February 6 to March 13, 1978 after the Blizzard of '78, and from June 24 to September 10, 1983 for track work between Wonderland and Orient Heights.

Renovations
Modernization and platform lengthening work at Wonderland, which included ramps and an elevator for accessibility, began in August 1988. Wonderland was the third Blue Line station to be made accessible (after Suffolk Downs in 1984 and State eastbound in 1987).

Wonderland was closed for approximately one year starting on June 25, 1994 as the station was rebuilt along with Suffolk Downs, Revere Beach and Beachmont stations as part of the Blue Line Modernization Program.  Blue Line service temporarily ended at Orient Heights and buses served the closed stations during project. Wonderland station was largely rebuilt at a cost of $9 million; it reopened along with the other stations on June 24, 1995. The station was closed while additional platform repair work was performed from June 21 to July 3, 2008.

Wonderland Intermodal Transit Center

As early as 1973, the MBTA proposed constructing a parking garage at Wonderland. The project was stalled by the 1973–1975 recession.

In 2006, the MBTA settled a lawsuit with the Conservation Law Foundation over emissions from increased auto traffic through downtown Boston due to the Big Dig. As part of the settlement, the MBTA was required to implement 20 transit improvements. One of these projects was the Wonderland Intermodal Transit Center, which started construction in September 2010 and opened on June 30, 2012.

The $53.5 million project, partially funded by the 2009 Stimulus Act, included the 1465-space South Parking Garage as well as a new sheltered busway, bicycle storage, and improved pedestrian connections. The MBTA began work on an elevated plaza at the station and a footbridge over Ocean Avenue to Revere Beach in September 2011. The $20 million project, including the Christina and John Markey Memorial Pedestrian Bridge opened on July 4, 2013.

Future plans
Ever since the 1954 Revere extension was cut short to Wonderland, a further extension to Lynn has been planned. Various state and federal reports in 1966, 1969, 1973, 1978, and 1983 all recommended extensions of the Blue Line to Lynn or even Salem, but funding was instead given to the Haymarket North Extension and Southwest Corridor projects on the Orange Line and the Alewife and Braintree extensions of the Red Line. The extension is still continually discussed, but due to the lack of an identified funding source it has not received priority. The Draft Environmental Impact Statement, which has been under development since 2002, will include several possible projects. They include extending the Blue Line directly to Lynn, a shorter extension to a new Revere Center commuter rail station, or a direct transfer from Wonderland via people mover to the new commuter rail station.

In March 2012, the MBTA announced plans to place solar panels on the roof of the new South Garage. The panels would be installed and maintained by an outside contractor. A winning bidder was chosen in June 2012 and approved by the board in September, with expected completion by June 2013.  However, as of 2015, the solar panels have not been installed.

Bus connections

As the terminus of the Blue Line, Wonderland serves as a major bus transfer station for the North Shore. All routes except southbound route 411 buses (which run on Ocean Avenue) use a busway in the garage off Route 1A, which opened on June 30, 2012. Previously, several routes used a two-lane busway off Ocean Avenue.

: Wonderland station–
: Wonderland station– via Revere Street
: Wonderland station–Maverick station via Beach Street
: Kennedy Drive or Jack Satter House–
: Eastern Avenue & Essex Street–Wonderland station
: Central Square, Lynn–Wonderland station
: Marblehead–Wonderland station via Paradise Road
: Marblehead–Wonderland station via Humphrey Street
: Salem Depot–Wonderland station
: Salem Depot–Wonderland station

Other routes formerly operated in this fashion: routes 441, 442, and 455 until July 1, 2012, and route 424 until September 1, 2019.

References

External links

 MBTA - Wonderland
 Intermodal Transit Center project: project page  and Environmental Impact Statements 
 Google Maps Street View: North Shore Road entrance, Ocean Avenue entrance

Blue Line (MBTA) stations
Railway stations in Suffolk County, Massachusetts
Former Boston, Revere Beach and Lynn Railroad stations
Railway stations in the United States opened in 1954
1954 establishments in Massachusetts
Revere, Massachusetts